The 2012 Columbus Crew season is the club's nineteenth year of existence, as well as their seventeenth season in Major League Soccer, and their seventeenth consecutive season in the top-flight of American soccer.

Columbus opened its 2012 campaign against the Colorado Rapids at Dick's Sporting Goods Park on March 10, 2012.

Background

Review 

The Crew missed the playoffs in 2012 for the first time since 2007, marking a further step backwards from the height of 2008. The roster moves which took place leading into the season were ultimately unsuccessful, with both high-profile signings - Milovan Mirosevic and Olman Vargas - playing only a single season for the club.

The lackluster performance of Vargas and Mirosevic led the team to a series of midseason signings, which nearly salvaged the season. Costa Rican forward Jairo Arrieta joined the team in June, while Argentine midfielder Federico Higuain signed a Designated Player contract a month later. The tandem revitalized the Crew's offense, leading to a 4-game winning streak and thoughts of post-season glory. After this initial honeymoon, however, the team's performance declined; the team just missed out on a playoff berth.

After the season, coach Robert Warzycha began yet another rebuilding effort, jettisoning several veteran players including William Hesmer, Sebastian Miranda and Emilio Renteria.

The year's most significant event, however, had nothing to do with on-field performance. Rookie midfielder Kirk Urso collapsed and died on August 5 from a genetic heart defect (arrhythmogenic right ventricular cardiomyopathy), providing an emotional rallying cry for the remainder of the season and beyond.

Roster

Competitions

Preseason

Carolina Challenge Cup

MLS

Standings

Eastern Conference

Overall table

Results summary

Results by round

Match results

U.S. Open Cup

MLS Cup Playoffs 

The Columbus Crew failed to qualify for the playoffs in this season.

Friendlies

Statistics

Transfers

In

Out

Loan in

Loan out

Miscellaneous

Allocation ranking 
Columbus is in the #10 position in the MLS Allocation Ranking. The allocation ranking is the mechanism used to determine which MLS club has first priority to acquire a U.S. National Team player who signs with MLS after playing abroad, or a former MLS player who returns to the league after having gone to a club abroad for a transfer fee. A ranking can be traded, provided that part of the compensation received in return is another club's ranking.

International roster spots
Columbus has 8 MLS International Roster Slots for use in the 2012 season. Each club in Major League Soccer is allocated 8 international roster spots and no Columbus trades have been reported.

Future draft pick trades
Future picks acquired: *2015 MLS SuperDraft Round 4 pick from Houston Dynamo.
Future picks traded: *2013 MLS Supplemental Draft conditional pick to Montreal Impact.

See also 
 Columbus Crew
 2012 in American soccer
 2012 Major League Soccer season

References 

Columbus Crew seasons
Columbus Crew
Columbus Crew
Columbus Crew